Stephanie Rose Wittels Wachs (born February 20, 1981) is an American voice actress, activist, and author. She is the co-founder and executive director of the theatre company Rec Room Arts in Houston, Texas and the co-founder and Chief Creative Officer of the podcast network Lemonada Media. Wachs serves as the host of the podcast Last Day.

Career

Memoir 
Wachs is the author of Everything is Horrible and Wonderful: A Tragicomic Memoir of Genius, Heroin, Love and Loss, a memoir about addiction, grief, and healing. Her other writing can be found on Vox, Longform, Huffington Post, Fatherly, Babble, and Medium.

Lemonada Media 
In 2017, Wachs appeared as a guest on the podcast Terrible, Thanks for Asking! discussing her struggle coping with her brother's death. At the time, Wachs was hosting a podcast of her own called Hands Off Parenting and continuing her work in voice acting. An Executive Producer of Crooked Media's Pod Save the People, Jessica Cordova Kramer, heard the episode and subsequently made contact with Wachs. Cordova Kramer had lost her brother, Stefano, to a battle with addiction earlier that year. In September 2019, the two teamed up to found the podcasting network Lemonada Media.

Lemonada Media's first launch was a narrative podcast breaking down the opioid crisis through personal interviews entitled Last Day. Last Day was an honoree in two categories at the 2020 Webby Awards and nominated for a 2020 iHeart Radio Award.

Wachs serves as chief content officer and executive producer for Lemonada Media's other slated podcasts, including Our America with Julian Castro, Tell Me What to Do with Jaime Primak Sullivan, and The Untold Story: Policing.

Press 
Wachs has been a guest on Late Night with Seth Meyers, NPR Weekend Edition, Houston Matters, and numerous podcasts including Comedy Bang! Bang!, Who Charted?, and Alison Rosen Is Your New Best Friend. She has been featured in People magazine, Entertainment Weekly, Bustle, The Hollywood Reporter, Arts & Culture Magazine, and as one of Houstonia Magazines "10 Houston Women Making it Happen."

Personal life 
Wachs is married to Mike Wachs. They have a daughter born in 2014 and a son born in 2018, named after her younger brother, Harris Wittels.

Filmography

Film

Television

References

External links

1981 births
21st-century American actresses
21st-century American singers
Actors Studio alumni
Actresses from Houston
Alumni of RADA
American people of Jewish descent
American voice actresses
Living people
Tisch School of the Arts alumni
University of Houston alumni
21st-century American women singers
Educators from Texas
American women educators